Swami Prakashananda is the founder and Acharya of Chinmaya Mission of Trinidad and Tobago.

Swami Prakashananda was born in California, Trinidad and Tobago.  While studying for a bachelor's degree in political science and philosophy from York University in Toronto, he met Swami Chinmayananda during Chinmaya Mission's jnana yajna.  He soon joined Chinmaya Mission started studying the scriptures at Mumbai in 1991.

Upon completion of his studies he was named Brahmachari Prem Chaitanya in 1994 and was assigned to give discourses at various Mission centers in India and Nepal.  Prem returned to Trinidad in 1997 and started Chinmaya Mission.  Swami Tejomayananda initiated Premji into Sanyasa as Swami Prakashananda on Mahashivaratri in 2005.

Swami Prakashananda travels extensively in Trinidad, the Caribbean, the U.S., Canada, and the United Kingdom for spiritual discourses.  His itinerary is available online.

Notes

21st-century Hindu religious leaders
Advaitin philosophers
Hindu spiritual teachers
Hindu philosophers and theologians
Hindu monks
Living people
Year of birth missing (living people)